American Christian musician Pat Barrett has released two studio albums, one live album, six extended play, and fourteen singles (including one promotional single).

Studio albums

Live albums

EPs

Singles

As lead artist

As featured artist

Promotional singles

Other charted songs

Other appearances

References

External links
  on AllMusic

Christian music discographies
Discographies of American artists